Edward Eliot may refer to:

Edward Craggs-Eliot, 1st Baron Eliot (1727–1804), British politician
Edward James Eliot (1758–1797), British politician, son of Craggs-Eliot
Edward Eliot, 3rd Earl of St Germans (1798–1877), British politician, grandson of Craggs-Eliot
Edward John Eliot (1782–1863), British soldier
Edward Eliot (1684–1722), Member of Parliament for St Germans 1705–1715, Lostwithiel 1718–1720 and Liskeard 1722
Edward Eliot (born 1618) (1618–1710), English politician
Edward Carlyon Eliot (1879–1940), British diplomat and Colonial Service administrator
Edward Eliot (priest) (1864–1943), Anglican archdeacon

See also
Edward Elliot (disambiguation)
Edward Elliott (disambiguation)